The 108th Air Refueling Squadron (108 ARS) is a unit of the Illinois Air National Guard 126th Air Refueling Wing located at Scott Air Force Base, Belleville, Illinois. The 108th is equipped with the KC-135R Stratotanker.

The squadron is a descendant organization of the World War I 108th Aero Squadron, established on 27 August 1917. It was reformed on 1 July 1927, as the 108th Observation Squadron, and is one of the 29 original National Guard Observation Squadrons of the United States Army National Guard formed before World War II.

History

World War I
The 108th Air Refueling Squadron origins date to 27 August 1917 when the 108th Aero Squadron was formed at Kelly Field, Texas. The personnel at the time was composed primarily of men from the upper Southern and Midwest, coming from the recruit depot at Fort Thomas, Kentucky. At Kelly, the squadron was put in a military indoctrination course of training until being ordered for overseas service on 26 October. It was moved to the Aviation Concentration Center, Garden City, Long Island. It arrived at Mineola Field on 3 November 1917 where it was prepared and equipped for overseas duty. On 7 December, it was ordered to proceed by train to St. John's, Newfoundland where, on 10 December, it boarded the SS Tuscania, and proceeded across the Atlantic and arrived at Liverpool, England on 26 December. It then moved by train to the English Channel port of Southampton, where it waited at a Rest Camp for several days before crossing to Le Havre, France on 28 December. It again waited for transportation at Le Havre before finally arriving at the Replacement Concentration Center, AEF, St. Maixent Replacement Barracks, France, arriving on 2 January 1918.

At St. Maixent, the squadron was placed in quarantine for several weeks due to the presence of mumps.  Finally, on 20 February, it was ordered to proceed to the 3d Air Instructional Center (3d AIC), Issoudun Aerodrome, in Central France, arriving on 21 February. It was first assigned to Field No. 2 where it was put to work in the Aero Repair Department while its permanent buildings were under construction at the main field. In May, the squadron was moved to its permanent quarters and buildings where it remained until after the Armistice with Germany in November 1918. It returned to the United States in late May 1918. Arrived at Mitchel Field, New York, where the squadron members were demobilized and returned to civilian life.

Illinois National Guard

In June 1927 the 108th Aero Squadron was re-activated, and designated the 108th Observation Squadron, 33d Division Aviation at Chicago Municipal Airport, Illinois. In July 1927 the unit received federal recognition; the squadron was authorized 16 officers, 74 enlisted and was assigned PT-1 Trusty aircraft. During the ensuing years, membership in the 108th Observation Squadron was a coveted assignment. Applicants were said to have been on waiting lists for as much as four years prior to being called.

In 1930, Douglas O-2H biplanes were assigned to the 108th Observation Squadron, followed by Douglas O-38 biplanes in 1935. No less than George C. Marshall was a member of the 33d Division from November 1933 to August 1936 as a senior instructor. During the next 10 years, the 108th performed outstanding civic service to the State of Illinois, dropping medicine and relief supplies to many of the towns in central and southern Illinois that were isolated by floodwaters, tornadoes, and fires. Captain Wilson V. Newhall, later to become the first chief of staff of the Illinois Air National Guard was awarded the Distinguished Service Medal during flood duty, in 1937, as a member of the 108th Observation Squadron.

World War II

After war broke out in Europe in 1939, preparedness for war increased in the United States. As part of the preparedness program, 4,800 members of the 33d Division, including the 108th Squadron were mobilized and placed on active duty in February 1941. The unit reequipped with the North American O-47 biplanes and initially trained at Chicago Municipal Airport in Chicago. The unit remained in Chicago until 14 January 1942 when it was assigned to the Caribbean Air Force after the Japanese attack on Pearl Harbor and arrived at Río Hato Army Air Base, Panama. The stay at Rio Hato was brief, however, as the squadron was moved to Howard Field in the Canal Zone on 19 January.

At Howard Field, the squadron was kept very busy on a myriad of patrol and communications flights along the Atlantic and Pacific Panamanian coast lines and within the far-flung command. The 108th also acquired several Stinson L-1's during this period along with a P-36A, one A-18, two L- l's and two L-4A's all based at Howard Field.

One of the L-4A's was transferred to the dedicated Tow Target Squadron at Howard Field on 28 February 1943, while the rare Curtiss A-18, to the relief of the hard-pressed maintenance crews, was transferred to the Technical School at Rio Hato on 3 April 1943. This was the only A-18 to serve operationally with a line combat unit during World War II.

The units first Douglas B-18 Bolo was added in February 1943. The squadron conducted one operational mission with this aircraft, along the "Pacific coast of Colombia" on 24 February. By 25 June 1943, by which time the designation had been changed to a more realistic 108th Reconnaissance Squadron (Special), the mission handed the Squadron were ever more complex and demanding, and the alterations to the equipment reflected this. Another Douglas B-18 (36-275) had been added in May 1943, the Squadron also gained small numbers of Piper L-4A's, Curtiss 0-52's (undocumented but recalled by Squadron members), and four Bell P-39N Airacobras.

In November 1943, the threat to the Panama Canal had decreased sufficiently that the 108th Reconnaissance Squadron was inactivated in the Canal Zone, and the personnel were reassigned to other units in one of the combat theaters.

Illinois Air National Guard
The wartime 108th Reconnaissance Squadron (Special) was re-designated the 108th Bombardment Squadron (Light), and was allocated to the Illinois Air National Guard on 21 June 1945. It was organized at Chicago Municipal Airport, and was extended federal recognition on 29 June 1947 by the National Guard Bureau. The 108th Bombardment Squadron was bestowed the history, honors, and colors of the wartime 108th and predecessor units. The squadron was equipped with B-26 Invader light bombers and was assigned to the Illinois ANG 126th Bombardment Group.

Korean War Activation

The unit was ordered to active service on 1 April 1951 as a result of the Korean War. The unit was initially assigned to Tactical Air Command at Langley AFB, Virginia. The wing moved to Bordeaux-Merignac Air Base, France with the first elements arriving in November 1951. The 126th BW was assigned to United States Air Forces in Europe. By 10 November, Bordeaux was considered an operational base and was assigned to the 12th Air Force.

At Bordeaux, the 126th BW consisted of the 108th, 168th and 180th Bomb Squadrons (Light). The aircraft were marked by various color bands on the vertical stabilizer and rudder. Black/Yellow/Blue for the 108th; Black/Yellow/Red for the 168th, and Black/Yellow/Green for the 180th. It flew B-26's for training and maneuvers and stayed at Bordeaux AB until being transferred Laon AB, France on 25 May 1952 where it remained for the balance of the year.

Cold War

After returning from France, was re-equipped with F-51D Mustangs due to the limited availability of jets which were being used by the USAF in the Korean War. In early 1955, was upgraded to new F-84F Thunderstreak jet fighters. In 1957 the 108th participated in the Ricks Trophy Race. In 1958, the 126th was re-designated as the 126th Air Defense Group and was transferred from TAC to Air Defense Command (ADC). ADC re-equipped the 108th, now a Fighter-Interceptor Squadron with day/nigh/all-weather F-86L Sabre Interceptor aircraft, and the squadron stood a 24/7 air defense alert at O'Hare IAP.

In July 1961, the 126th was realigned from an air defense mission to becoming the first Air National Guard air refueling group under Tactical Air Command. It was re-equipped with KC-97 Stratofreighters and began worldwide aerial refueling operations. In 1963, the 108th was the first squadron to mid-air refuel the elite Air Force Thunderbirds, and in 1964, it participated in Operation "Ready Go", the first all United States Air National Guard (ANG) non-stop deployment of fighter aircraft to Europe.

In 1966 the squadron began a rotational deployment to Rhein-Main Air Base in support of Operation Creek Party. Which provided USAFE an air refueling capability. The Creek Party deployment rotations lasted until 1976, and over the decade the 108th saw millions of pounds of jet fuel off-loaded and millions of miles flown, all accident free.

In July 1976 the KC-97s were retired and the parent 126th was transferred to Strategic Air Command, receiving jet KC-135A Stratotankers. These aircraft were later upgraded to "E" models in 1983 and finally replaced with "R" models in 2008.

On 19 December 1990, President Bush ordered 268 members of the 126th Air Refueling Wing, the 108th Air Refueling Squadron and elements of the 126th Consolidated Aircraft Maintenance Squadron federalized for active duty during the 1991 Gulf Crisis. During Operation Desert Storm, the squadron performed air refueling operations as part of the 1709th Air Refueling Wing (Provisional), stationed at King Abdul Aziz Air Base, Jeddah, Saudi Arabia, and as part of the 1712th Air Refueling Wing (Provisional), stationed at Abu Dhabi, UAE, until being returned to Illinois state control on 22 March 1991.

Twenty-first century 
The 126th ARW relocated to Scott Air Force Base in 1999 from Chicago's O'Hare International Airport as part of the recommendations for base closure made by the Base Realignment and Closure Commission.

After the September 11 terrorist attacks, the 126th Air Refueling Wing has been tasked on several occasions for deployment to United States Air Forces Central. Elements of the wing have been assembled and deployed as the 108th Expeditionary Air Refueling Squadron as part of AEF packages, providing air refueling to combat aircraft for the American War in Afghanistan and Iraq War during the 2000s.

In its 2005 BRAC Recommendations, DoD recommended to realign Grand Forks Air Force Base, North Dakota. It would distribute the 319th Air Refueling Wing's KC-135R aircraft to the 126th Air Refueling Wing (ANG), Scott AFB, IL (12 aircraft) and several other institutions. The 126th would retire its eight KC-135E aircraft. Scott would receive KC-135R model aircraft to replace older, higher maintenance KC-135E models.

Lineage

 Organized as 108th Aero Squadron** on 27 August 1917
 Re-designated 802d Aero Squadron on 1 February 1918
 Re-designated 802d Aero Squadron (Repair) on 21 February 1918
 Demobilized on 11 June 1919
 Reconstituted and consolidated (1936) with 108th Observation Squadron which, having been allotted to Illinois NG, was activated on 1 July 1927
 Ordered to active service on 3 February 1941
 Re-designated: 108th Observation Squadron (Medium) on 13 January 1942
 Re-designated: 108th Observation Squadron on 4 July 1942
 Re-designated: 108th Reconnaissance Squadron (Special) on 25 June 1943
 Inactivated on 1 November 1943
 Re-designated: 108th Bombardment Squadron (Light), and allotted to Illinois ANG, on 24 May 1946
 Extended federal recognition on 29 June 1947
 Federalized and ordered to active service on: 1 April 1951
 Relieved from active duty and returned to Illinois State Control: 1 January 1953
 Re-designated: 108th Fighter-Bomber Squadron, 1 January 1953
 Re-designated: 108th Fighter-Interceptor Squadron, 1 July 1955
 Re-designated: 108th Air Refueling Squadron, 1 July 1961
 Federalized and ordered to active service on: 19 December 1990
 Deployed elements designated: 108th Air Refueling Squadron (Provisional), 29 December 1990
 Relieved from active duty and returned to Illinois State Control: 22 March 1991
 Components designated as: 108th Expeditionary Air Refueling Squadron when deployed as part of an Air and Space Expeditionary unit after June 1996.

** This unit is not related to another 108th Aero Squadron (Service) that was activated in March 1918 at Rich Field, Waco, Texas.

Assignments
 Post Headquarters, Kelly Field, 27 August-1 November 1917
 Aviation Concentration Center, 1 November-7 December 1917
 Replacement Concentration Center, AEF, 2 January-21 February 1918
 3d Aviation Instruction Center, 21 February 1918 – April 1919
 Commanding General, Services of Supply, April-27 May 1919
 Post Headquarters, Mitchel Field, 27 May-11 June 1919
 Illinois NG (divisional aviation, 33d Division), 1 July 1927
 Second Army, 3 February 1941
 II Air Support Command, 1 September 1941
 72d Observation (later Reconnaissance) Group, 26 September 1941 – 1 November 1943
 126th Bombardment Group (Light), 29 June 1947
 126th Composite Group, 1 November 1950
 126th Bombardment Group, 1 February 1951
 126th Fighter-Bomber Group, 1 January 1953
 126th Fighter-Interceptor Group, 1 July 1955
 126th Air Refueling Group, 1 July 1961
 126th Air Refueling Wing, 1 July 1976
 Elements assigned to 1709th Air Refueling Wing (Provisional) and 1712th Air Refueling Wing (Provisional), 19 December 1990 – 22 March 1991
 126th Operations Group, 3 February 1992 – Present

Stations

 Kelly Field, Texas, 27 August 1917
 Aviation Concentration Center, Garden City, New York, 1 November-7 December 1917
 St. Maixent Replacement Barracks, France, 2 January 1918
 Issoudun Aerodrome, France, 21 Feb 1918-c. Apr 1919
 Mitchel Field, New York, c. 27 May-11 Jun 1919
 Chicago Municipal Airport, Chicago, Illinois, 1 July 1927 – 28 December 1941
 Rio Hato Army Air Base, Panama, 14 January 1942
 Howard Field, Canal Zone, 19 January 1942 – 1 November 1943

 Chicago Municipal Airport, Illinois 29 June 1947 – 1 April 1951
 Langley AFB, Virginia, 1 April – 1 November 1951
 Bordeaux-Merignac Air Base, France 1 November 1951 – 25 May 1952
 Laon-Couvron Air Base, France, 25 May 1952 – 31 December 1952
 Chicago Municipal Airport (Later O'Hare IAP) Illinois, 1 January 1953 – 31 July 1999
 Scott AFB, Illinois, 31 July 1999 – present

Aircraft

 Included PT-1, BT-1, and 0-2 during period 1927–1931
 Douglas O-38, 1931–1941
 Douglas O-2, 1931–1934
 Douglas O-31, 1935–1941
 O-49 Vigilant, 1941–1943
 O-51 Dragonfly, 1941
 North American O-47, 1942–1943)
 P-39N Airacobra, 1942–1943
 A-18 Shrike, 1943

 P-36 Hawk, 1943
 B-26 Invader, 1947–1953
 F-51D Mustang, 1953–1955
 F-84F Thunderstreak, 1955–1957
 F-86L Sabre Interceptor, 1957–1958
 KC-97 Stratofreighter, 1961–1976
 KC-135A Stratotanker, 1976–1983
 KC-135E Stratotanker, 1983–2008
 KC-135R Stratotanker, 2008 – present

See also

 List of American aero squadrons
 List of observation squadrons of the United States Army National Guard

References

 
 126th Air Refueling Wing history
 Early 108th Observation Squadron history
 Rogers, B. (2006). United States Air Force Unit Designations Since 1978. 
  Cornett, Lloyd H. and Johnson, Mildred W., A Handbook of Aerospace Defense Organization  1946–1980, Office of History, Aerospace Defense Center, Peterson AFB, CO (1980).
  Hagedorn, Dan. Alae Supra a Canalem: Wings Over The Canal, The 6th Air Force and the Antilles Air Command. Paducah, Kentucky: Turner Publishing Co., 1995.

External links
 126th Air Refueling Wing Homepage

Squadrons of the United States Air National Guard
Air refueling squadrons of the United States Air Force
Military units and formations in Illinois